Henry Ford Jackson Hospital is a 420-bed health system in Jackson in the U.S. state of Michigan.

For more than 100 years, Jackson-area families have looked to Henry Ford Jackson Hospital as their community health provider. It has grown to become a regional teaching hospital with all private patient rooms and 420 beds. The Hospital is supported by a network of 33 clinical outpatient facilities, including primary care, specialty care and diagnostic centers in Albion, Brooklyn, Chelsea, Grass Lake, Jackson, Leslie, Mason Michigan Center, Spring Arbor and Vandercook Michigan. 

The Henry Ford Jackson Hospital team is composed of approximately 400 physicians and advanced practice providers, as well as nearly 4,000 staff members. 

Complementing traditional acute care services with mission-based services, Henry Ford Jackson Hospital extends the continuum of care to every member of the community. As a Level II Trauma Center, the Hospital is able to admit and treat the most seriously injured patients. Earning Magnet recognition from the American Nurses Credentialing Center, it stands among only 8.28 percent of all U.S. hospitals to achieve this distinction for excellence in nursing care.

As part of Henry Ford Health, a nationally recognized integrated healthcare network, Henry Ford Jackson Hospital is able to provide local access to world-class research, technology, treatments and services. 

Local patients with cancer, for example, have the advantage of Henry Ford Jackson Hospital’s Varian Ethos™ radiation therapy system. Artificial intelligence makes it possible to immediately adjust the radiation dosage within a treatment session, according to the continual changes in the shape and positioning of an individual’s tumor—while avoiding normal, healthy tissue. The Hospital also offers the latest proven advancements in chemotherapy and immunotherapy, as well as access to precision medicine, which determines the most effective cancer treatment for a patient, based on the individual’s unique DNA.

For patients with heart disease, Henry Ford Jackson Hospital provides complete cardiovascular services, from prevention, testing and diagnostics to open heart surgery and minimally invasive heart valve replacement and aneurysm repair. The Hospital is also outstanding in the field of electrophysiology, which relates to the electrical activity of the heart. Patients with an irregular heart rhythm have access to the newest clinically proven treatments and procedures.

Henry Ford Jackson Hospital’s comprehensive orthopedic services provide non-surgical solutions, as well as minimally invasive joint repair and complex total joint replacement surgery, including hip, knee, ankle, shoulder and wrist.  

Advanced neurosurgery options are also available at Henry Ford Jackson Hospital for patients with medical issues affecting the brain, spine and neck.

Further supporting the full continuum of care, Henry Ford Jackson Hospital helps patients safely maintain their independence with AT Home services and Advanced Illness Management. At the end of life, patients of Henry Ford Hospice services and Henry Ford Hospice Home are insured dignified and compassionate comfort care—as well as emotional and spiritual support for themselves and their families.

Through its Health Improvement Organization, Henry Ford Jackson Hospital is also a national leader in forming community partnerships that innovatively address wellness and prevention needs in the community. Visit HenryFord.com to learn more.

History

More than 100 years ago, Jackson, Michigan, resident Ida Foote was concerned about the availability of quality health care in the area. She donated land for the construction of a new hospital, in honor of her late husband, W.A. Foote. Foote Hospital opened its doors to patients in 1918, and the hospital is still located on its original site.

In 1975, the Hospital merged in ownership with Mercy Hospital, which had been operated by the Sisters of Mercy. Several years later, the two moved into one larger, more modern facility, which was completed in 1983.

In 2008, Foote Health System rebranded to become Allegiance Health. In that same year, the health system brought open-heart surgery and non-emergent cardiac intervention services to Jackson County for the first time, with the opening of the Allegiance Health Heart and Vascular Center. 

On November 10, 2015 Allegiance Health announced an agreement to join Henry Ford Health System. [4] The partnership was completed on April 1, 2016, when the Hospital became Henry Ford Allegiance Health.

In April 2022, Henry Ford Health System rebranded to become Henry Ford Health, and Henry Ford Allegiance Health was renamed Henry Ford Jackson Hospital.

Henry Ford Jackson Hospital is proud of its long, successful history and of its continued commitment to the health and well-being of its community and region.

References

External links 
 [https://www.HenryFord.com 
 https://www.henryford.com/locations/allegiance-health

                                                             

Hospitals in Michigan
Jackson, Michigan
Trauma centers